Ostracophyto is a genus of bristle flies in the family Tachinidae. There are at least two described species in Ostracophyto.

Species
 Ostracophyto aristalis Townsend, 1915
 Ostracophyto flavicaudalis O'Hara, 2002

References

Further reading

External links

 

Tachininae